Pretty Girl Special Edition (also known as Honey), is a repackage of South Korean girl group Kara's second EP Pretty Girl (2008). It was released digitally on February 12, 2009, with a physical release on February 18, 2009.

In contrast to Pretty Girl'''s cute and lively concept, the title track "Honey" is more wistful and features the members of Kara as soft, feminine women. The song was remixed from the original version, and also underwent a slight name change from "" (Ha-ni) to "Honey". It is considered the group's first hit.

Background
"Good Day, Season 2" was the group's first digital single. It is a remix of "Good Day" from their first mini-album "Rock U". It was released on October 13, 2008, and later included on the Honey EP.  It was rearranged by Han Jae Ho and Kim Seung Soo, the same people who produced Kara's "Rock U", as well as the original soundtrack of the hit drama series "달콤한 나의 도시: My Sweet Seoul", the songs "You Are My Heaven" and "Find" by SS501, and "고맙다" ("Thank You") by Kim Hyun Joong.

A repackaged mini-album edition of the Pretty Girl EP was scheduled to be released on February 19, but was then moved up a day to February 18. The new EP features "Honey", various remixes of "Pretty Girl", and a remix "Good Day Season 2", a song that was initially only given a digital release.

The second single from the EP was "Honey".  Kara filmed the music video for "Honey" on February 10. The music video was to be released on February 17 but was moved up a day to February 16.  The music video features the girls in pure angelic dresses sitting at home.

Promotion
The group debuted "Honey" on KBS's Music Bank program on February 13, 2009.

 Commercial performance 
The Gaon Music Chart was launched in February 2010 as the official chart for South Korea, a year after the EP was released. The mini album entered at number 84 on the Gaon Album Chart for the second week of 2010 and peaked at number 2 on the week ending April 17, 2010. It spent three non-consecutive weeks in the top 10 in 2010 and became their second top 5 album as well as their third top 10 album.

Kara member Han Seung-yeon noted that the title track "Honey" climbed the charts much faster than "Pretty Girl" did, while Goo Hara stated that the song appealed to an older age group.

After a few weeks, "Honey" achieved its first #1 on M.Net's M Countdown'' show on March 5, 2009.  The song also won the a first-place award on SBS's Inkigayo program.

Track listing

Charts

References

2009 EPs
Kara (South Korean group) EPs